Wenger is a Swiss Army knife manufacturer.

Wenger may also refer to:

 Wenger (surname), a surname of German origin
 Wenger, California, a ghost town in Mariposa County, California
 Stade Arsène Wenger, a French football stadium
 Martin Wenger House, an historic home in St. Joseph County, Indiana
 Wenger Church, or Groffdale Conference Mennonite Church
 Wenger Mennonite, or Wengerite, an Old Order Mennonites denomination
 Wenger Corp., part of LARES, an electronic sound enhancement system

See also